Hot Radio is a community radio station for Bournemouth, Christchurch and Poole and the surrounding areas offering rhythmic music and local information.

The station started life as "The Bay 102.8" and was awarded a community radio licence by Ofcom in 2007 and began broadcasting at 00:01 on 8 November 2008. Community Radio stations in the UK are required to provide a social gain to the community they serve. Hot Radio is one of a growing number of such stations in the UK.

Based in Poole, Hot radio provides regular traffic & travel, job information, what's ons and other local information and interviews. The station plays a mix of music from the 90's to today including upbeat dance, funk, soul and RnB during normal daytime output. Hot radio also provides specialist programming evenings and weekends with local specialist DJs experienced within their music genre. The station also provides broadcasts from major local events.

At 7:00am on 14 February 2012 "The Bay 102.8" re-branded to "Hot Radio 102.8". The last song played on The Bay 102.8 was "Never Can Say Goodbye" by The Communards.

The first song on Hot Radio was "Some Like It Hot" by The Power Station when Paul Stevens announced the new brand to listeners.

On 8 November 2013, Hot Radio was awarded a 5-year extension by ofcom to continue providing community radio to Poole & the surrounding area. On 8 November 2018, Hot Radio was awarded another 5-year extension by ofcom to continue providing community radio to Poole & the surrounding area.

On 6 February 2018, Hot Radio relaunched with a brand new sound and line up.

Hot Radio is also now available on DAB across Dorset. Since late 2020 it is also available on DAB across South Hampshire.

Current daytime presenters 
Glen Mitchell – Breakfast & Programmer Controller
Mark Rush Palmer - Mid Mornings
Jo Jo - Hot Afternoons
Martyn The Hat - Lunchbox & Director
Kev Scott - Lunchbox & Operations
Sparky - Hot Rewind
Kitcat - Hot Drive
Ryan Cable - Hot Evenings
Cabreeni - Weekend Breakfast
Chris Morley – Saturday Mornings
Russell Perry – Sunday Lunch
Elysa Marsden & Dave Webster – Saturday Lunch
Alan Matthews – Dance Classics

Specialist shows 
Melvo Baptiste – Glitterbox
Dr Feelgood – The Surgery
Nick Power – Soul Kandi
Jeff Keenan – Steamhouse Rock Nites Show
Mark Knight – Toolroom
Paul Van Dyk – Vonyc Sessions
Slipmatt – World of Rave
Graham Gold – Esta La Musica
Seamus Haji – Big Love
Robbie Rivera – Juicy Show
Andy Durrant – Transmission
Lucas & Steve – Skyline Sessions
Ferry Corsten – Corsten's Countdown
Nora En Pure – Purified
Chicane – Sun:Sets
Judge Jules – Global Warm Up
Sam Divine – Defected in the House
Sister Bliss – In Session 
DJ Glitterballz – The Weekend Warmup
Mark J – House Sessions
Sam EB – Hot House & Garage
Paul Brady – Sunday Soul Society
Don Jon – Night Moves
Wayne DJ-C – Beyond Control Techno
Vanson – Midnight Sessions

References

External links
The Hot Radio 102.8 official website
Media UK Station Profile
Hot Radio given 5 year extension

Community radio stations in the United Kingdom
Radio stations established in 2008
Radio stations in Dorset

Bournemouth, Christchurch and Poole